Eric Sage is an international touring singer, entertainer, recording artist, and actor. He has recorded two solo albums, Redeem My Heart and Ain't No Rock Stars Anymore. He has recorded and performed with Slash of Guns ‘n’, Roses/Velvet Revolver, Vince Neil of Mötley Crüe and the Beach Boys. Eric is currently working as a guest entertainer on cruise ships with his production Eric Sage’s Ultimate Rock Show. He leads a national touring country show called Young Guns, and has tribute shows to Bon Jovi and Keith Urban. He also tours and records as the lead singer for the rock legends the Bay City Rollers, featuring Ian Mitchell.

Known for his dynamic live shows and three-octave range, he also plays guitar and piano. His vocal style performs rock, country, pop, and top-40 to standards.

Eric has a past as a world-ranked tennis professional and actor. He has publish a book titled The Magic Key To Tennis. He also does motivational seminars. While in LA, Eric landed roles in films like The Soldier, and  Wayne’s World, where he played the 'guitar salesmen’ ("No Stairway to Heaven"), and also acted in multiple commercials.

Early Years 
Eric Sage was born in Toronto, Ontario to American parents and has dual citizenship. He was #1 in Canada as a junior tennis player. He trained and played with the likes of Pete Sampras, Michael Chang, Lindsay Davenport, and Stefan Edberg at Bollettieri Tennis Academy in Florida. He received a tennis scholarship to San Diego State University and then traveled worldwide playing on the professional tour for four years where he earned an ATP world tennis ranking. After surviving a severe car crash, Sage's professional tennis career was over and he began to focus on his music career.

He founded the Los Angeles Tennis Academy and was the tennis director at the Hotel Del Coronado in San Diego.

Sage studied voice with Seth Riggs and piano with Terry Trotter. 
Eric also appeared in a few films, most notably as the Guitar Salesman in Wayne's World.

References

Living people
Year of birth missing (living people)
21st-century American singers
21st-century American male singers